Storms of Passion (German: Stürme der Leidenschaft) is a 1932 German crime film directed by Robert Siodmak and starring Emil Jannings, Anna Sten and Trude Hesterberg. It is regarded as a precursor of film noir. The film was produced by Germany's leading film company UFA and shot at the Babelsberg Studios in Berlin. The sets were designed by the art director Erich Kettelhut. It premiered at the Ufa-Palast am Zoo on 22 January 1932. An alternative French language version Tumultes, starring Charles Boyer, was also released.

Cast
 Emil Jannings as Gustav Bumke 
 Anna Sten as Russen-Annya 
 Trude Hesterberg as Yvonne 
 Franz Nicklisch as Willy Prawanzke 
 Otto Wernicke as Police Commissioner 
 Hans Deppe as Der Nuschler 
 Hans Reimann as Max 
 Julius Falkenstein as Paul 
 Anton Pointner as Ralph Kruschewski 
 Wilhelm Bendow as Emmerich 
 Hermann Vallentin as Gefängnisdirektor

References

Bibliography
 Grange, William. Cultural Chronicle of the Weimar Republic. Scarecrow Press, 2008.
 Hardt, Ursula. From Caligari to California: Erich Pommer's life in the International Film Wars. Berghahn Books, 1996.
 Spicer, Andrew. Historical Dictionary of Film Noir. Scarecrow Press, 2010.

External links

1932 films
Films of the Weimar Republic
1932 crime films
German crime films
1930s German-language films
Films directed by Robert Siodmak
German multilingual films
German black-and-white films
Films produced by Erich Pommer
UFA GmbH films
1932 multilingual films
1930s German films
Films shot at Babelsberg Studios